Labastide-du-Haut-Mont is a rural commune in the Lot department in the Occitania region in Southwestern France. It is located on the departmental border with Cantal, which is also the regional border with Auvergne-Rhône-Alpes. In 2019, Labastide-du-Haut-Mont had a population of 50.

See also
Communes of the Lot department

References

Labastideduhautmont